The Continental O-526  is a family of air-cooled flat-6 aircraft piston engines built by Teledyne Continental Motors.

Development
The O-526 was introduced with reduction gearing and a supercharger as the GSO-526 for the Cessna 620

Specifications (GSO-526)

See also

References

Boxer engines
1950s aircraft piston engines
O-526